Ana Paula Vázquez (born 5 October 2000) is a Mexican archer. She competed in the women's individual event at the 2020 Summer Olympics held in Tokyo, Japan. Two months later, she won the silver medal in the women's team event at the 2021 World Archery Championships held in Yankton, United States.

References

External links
 

2000 births
Living people
Mexican female archers
Olympic archers of Mexico
Archers at the 2020 Summer Olympics
Sportspeople from Coahuila
World Archery Championships medalists
21st-century Mexican women